Patrick Joseph (born 3 May 1998) is a Fijian footballer who plays as a midfielder for Fijian club Nadi and the Fiji national team.

Club career
Joseph came through the youth ranks of Nadi. In 2016 he made his debut for the first team. The first tournament that Joseph participated in was the Vodafone Fiji Fact in May 2017. In 2019 Joseph won his first prize for Nadi by winning the Fiji FACT in 2019. Joseph was named as Most Valuable Player of the tournament.

National team
In 2019 Joseph was called up by coach Christophe Gamel for the Fiji national football team. He made his debut on March 18, 2019, in a 3–0 win against New Caledonia. He came in for Dave Radrigai in the 69th minute of play. After his debut Joseph was included in Gamel's squad for the 2019 Pacific Games were Joseph and his teammates managed to win a bronze medal. Joseph scored his first goal for the national team at the Pacific Games in a 4–4 draw against the Solomon Islands

References

External links
 

Living people
1998 births
Fijian footballers
Fiji international footballers
Association football midfielders
Sportspeople from Nadi